The Origin of Love is the third studio album released by British singer-songwriter Mika. The album was released in France on 17 September 2012, and in the United Kingdom on 8 October 2012, via Casablanca Records and Barclay Records respectively. The album was preceded by an alternate lead single in each region. "Elle me dit" was first released in France, whereas "Celebrate" served as the first official single for the United Kingdom.

Background
Mika's second studio album, The Boy Who Knew Too Much, was released in September 2009. It garnered positive critical reviews upon release, and debuted at its peak position of number four on the UK Albums Chart.

Mika worked with Greg Wells, Dan Wilson, Nick Littlemore and Klas Åhlund on The Origin of Love. The team contributed both written material and production credits. Mika was confirmed to be recording the album in various locations, including Montreal, Miami and Sweden. In an interview for Digital Spy, Mika described the album as "more simplistic pop, less layered than the last one". He also described the album's themes as dealing with the adult years, claiming that "it's a serious album, but still has the boppy, happy tunes." In an interview for a popular French magazine, Mika claimed that the album's musical style will include elements of Daft Punk and Fleetwood Mac.

This album will mark the beginning of the collaboration with Max Taylor (Creepy Neighbor), who will, from then, accompany Mika on bass and vocals during his tours, as well as on his albums.

Singles
"Elle me dit" was released as the album's lead single in France. The song was first rumoured when a twelve-second preview was published online on 1 July 2011. Just ten days later, the French iTunes Store made the whole song available as a digital download. However, its official release did not occur until 26 September 2011. The single was very successful, peaking at number one on the French Singles Chart. "Elle me dit" appears on the regular version of the album in English, as the track "Emily".

"Celebrate" was released as the album's lead single in the United Kingdom, Europe and the United States, and the second single in France. The single was made available in French-speaking countries on 1 June 2012. The song features American singer Pharrell Williams and was written by Mika, Williams and Fryars, and produced by Peter Mayes and Nick Littlemore. On 14 June 2012, Mika revealed a 30-second clip of the song. It was uploaded to Amazon ahead of its official unveiling the next day. The song was officially released on 15 June 2012. The single was released in the United Kingdom on 1 October 2012.

"Underwater" was released as the album's third single in France, and the second single in Europe, on 23 November 2012. The music video for the track was filmed in Los Angeles during the third week of October, and premiered on 21 November 2012, just two days' before the single's official release. The single peaked at #134 in France, becoming Mika's worst performing single in the region. The single will not be released in the United Kingdom, and instead, the single's artwork was adapted for the British equivalent single release, "The Origin of Love".

"Origin of Love" was released as the album's second single in the United Kingdom on 3 December 2012. It carried the same artwork as its European equivalent release, "Underwater", but was heavily edited for radio play. The music video for the original version of the track originally premiered on 15 September 2012, and was filmed in Chile. It featured explicit scenes of a man and a woman engaging in sex, whilst in a loving relationship. The video was shown on British music channels, but these were edited out, replacing the original version of the track with the radio version.

"Popular Song" was released as the album's second single in the United States on 21 December 2012. The song was heavily edited for its release as a single, completely rearranging the instrumentation, tempo and removing the expletives "bitch" and "shit" from the lyrics. The single version also features Ariana Grande, instead of Priscilla Renea, who appears on the album version. The single version bears a strong resemblance to Mika's debut single, "Grace Kelly".

Commercial performance
In Mika's home country of the United Kingdom, The Origin of Love briefly appeared at number 24 on the UK Albums Chart, the issue dated 20 October 2012. It also was number 32 on the Scottish Albums Chart that same week, a regional chart for the UK Albums Chart. The album was the most successful in France, where it debuted at number one on the country's album chart and was certified platinum by the SNEP. The record also reached the top ten in Belgium and Korea; In Belgium, the album peaked at number seven in Flanders and number six in Wallonia, while in Korea it was number nine on the country's main album chart and topped the nation's International Albums chart. In the United States, it debuted at No. 47 on Billboard 200 with 8,500 copies sold in its first week, and has sold 33,000 copies in the US as of May 2015.

Track listing

Charts

Year-end charts

Certifications

Release history

References

2012 albums
Albums produced by Klas Åhlund
Albums produced by Fryars
Albums produced by Greg Wells
Mika (singer) albums